Roze Kate is a 1912 Dutch silent drama film thriller directed by Oscar Tourniaire.

Plot
Roze Kate is in love with a boy named Everhard.  However, Everhard's brothers Jacob and Simon are jealous of him.  When they discover their heritage will be lost when their mother dies, they decide to kill Roze Kate.

Cast
Caroline van Dommelen	... 	Roze Kate
Louis van Dommelen	... 	Everhard
Jan van Dommelen		
Jef Mertens		
Ansje van Dommelen-Kapper		
Anton Roemer		
Oscar Tourniaire

External links 
 

1912 films
Dutch silent short films
Dutch black-and-white films
1912 drama films
Dutch drama films
Silent drama films